Joseph Murphy (born 21 August 1981) is an Irish professional footballer who plays as a goalkeeper for Tranmere Rovers.

Murphy began his career with Tranmere Rovers, and has since represented eight other clubs, making over 666 appearances in the Football League and playing twice in the Premier League for West Bromwich Albion in 2002.

Born in Dublin, he was capped twice by the Republic of Ireland at international level in 2003 and 2010.

Club career

Early career
With his first club, Tranmere Rovers, Murphy played in the 2000 Football League Cup Final, before joining West Bromwich Albion in July 2002. With his first touches in a Premier League game, Murphy saved a Michael Owen penalty following the sending off of Russell Hoult. He spent the majority of the 2004–05 season on loan at Walsall. In August 2005, he moved from West Brom to Sunderland, but was again loaned to Walsall during 2005–06.

Scunthorpe United
Murphy signed for Scunthorpe United in May 2006 after being released by Sunderland. He had an excellent 2006–07 season, and was an integral part of the team that led Scunthorpe to the League One trophy. He was in the League One team of the season, and also won the golden glove (award for most clean sheets). He was also named League One player of the month for February 2007. On top of this, he hit the crossbar during Soccer AM's crossbar challenge. His clean sheet in Scunthorpe's 2–0 home victory over Burnley on 30 September 2007 earned him a place in the Championship Team of the Week. He made the Team of the Week once more following his side's 1–0 victory over Charlton Athletic in February.

Murphy enjoyed a good set of performances during the 2008–09 season but never caught the eye of Republic of Ireland manager Giovanni Trappatonni due to playing in the third tier. Murphy's performance in the League One play-off semi-final second leg against MK Dons helped the team proceed to the final as he kept a clean sheet in 120 minutes and saved two penalties in the shootout from Jason Puncheon and Jude Stirling. Scunthorpe won the play-off final against Millwall.

Murphy's contract was to end at the end of the 2008–09 season and there was much speculation as to where his future lay; many reports suggested that he would be moving to a much bigger club to gain international football for Ireland. This speculation was ended when he signed a one-year contract extension with Scunthorpe, extendable to 2011 if the Iron remained in the Championship. He told local newspapers that he signed the new deal because "He owed the club for all it has done for him". He was selected as a member of the League One team of the year for 2008–09.

Murphy was one of seven players to be released by Scunthorpe in May 2011. He was not offered a new contract because of cost-cutting measures implemented after the team was relegated.

Coventry City
On 30 June 2011, Murphy joined Championship club Coventry City on a three-year deal.

Huddersfield Town
Murphy signed for Championship side Huddersfield Town on a two-year contract, with the option of a further year in the club's favour, on 17 June 2014. Although expected to start as 2nd choice, he aimed to challenge Alex Smithies for the goalkeeper spot. After making his début in the League Cup first round match against Chesterfield in August, he would make his league début against Sheffield Wednesday on 22 November 2014.

Chesterfield (loan)
On 9 May 2015, Murphy was sent on a week-long emergency loan to Chesterfield for their play-off campaign, following an injury to Tommy Lee. Unfortunately, he couldn't help the Spireites get to Wembley, as they lost in the two-legged semi-final to Preston North End.

Bury
On 30 January 2017, Murphy signed a loan deal with Football League One side Bury to the end of the 2016–17 season, making sixteen first team appearances. He left Huddersfield on 1 July 2017 to sign a full contract with Bury and made eighteen first team appearances in 2017–18. Bury were relegated to League Two in May 2018 but Murphy's contract was extended by one year and he has played in every Bury match of the 2018–19 season to date.

Shrewsbury Town
On 4 July 2019, Murphy signed for League One side Shrewsbury Town on a free transfer, signing a one-year deal, becoming the club's seventh summer signing.

At the end of the season, Murphy was not offered a contract extension and was released by the club on 11 June 2020.

Tranmere Rovers
On the 22nd August Joe Murphy signed a 1 year deal to rejoin Tranmere Rovers. On 26 May 2022, Murphy signed for another year, taking on the additional role of goalkeeping coach while remaining on the playing staff.

International career
Murphy is a former member of the Republic of Ireland national under-21 team and has been capped twice at senior level for the Republic.

Career statistics

Club

International

Honours
Tranmere Rovers
Football League Cup runner-up: 1999–2000
EFL Trophy runner-up: 2020–21

Scunthorpe United
Football League One: 2006–07
Football League Trophy runner-up: 2008–09
Football League One play-offs: 2009

Bury
EFL League Two runner-up: 2018–19

Republic of Ireland U16
UEFA European Under-16 Championship: 1998

Individual
PFA Team of the Year: 2006–07 League One, 2008–09 League One, 2018–19 League Two
FAI Under-21 Footballer of The Year: 2002
Football League One Golden Glove: 2006–07

References

External links

1981 births
Living people
Association footballers from Dublin (city)
Republic of Ireland association footballers
Republic of Ireland youth international footballers
Republic of Ireland under-21 international footballers
Republic of Ireland international footballers
Association football goalkeepers
Tranmere Rovers F.C. players
West Bromwich Albion F.C. players
Walsall F.C. players
Sunderland A.F.C. players
Scunthorpe United F.C. players
Coventry City F.C. players
Huddersfield Town A.F.C. players
Chesterfield F.C. players
Bury F.C. players
English Football League players
Premier League players
Republic of Ireland expatriate association footballers
Expatriate footballers in England
Irish expatriate sportspeople in England
Bury F.C. non-playing staff
Shrewsbury Town F.C. players